La Belle Iron Works, also known as La Belle Cut Nail Works, was a historic factory complex and national historic district located at Wheeling, Ohio County, West Virginia. The district included four contributing buildings; three Italianate style brick buildings dated to the founding of the company in 1852, and a tin plate mill built 1894–1897.  After 1902, the buildings were combined under a single roof, although the truss systems date to different periods achieving the configuration visible today.  When listed in 1997, it was known as the "La Belle Cut Nail Plant, The Largest in the World, Wheeling Corrugating Company, A Division of Wheeling Pittsburgh Steel Corporation." The cut nail machinery still in use by La Belle dated to 1852 and the 1860s. The machinery at La Belle along with the different processes were documented by the Historic American Buildings Survey team during the summer of 1990.

The plant stopped operation in 2010, and was demolished in 2017.

It was listed on the National Register of Historic Places in 1997.

References

External links

LaBelle Iron Works Corliss Engine January 27, 2010, YouTube video
La Belle Iron Works history, from the Wheeling Register, Sunday, Feb. 5, 1922, sec. 4, p. 1
e-WV: The West Virginia Encyclopedia, La Belle Iron Works article, October 7, 2010

Buildings and structures in Wheeling, West Virginia
Industrial buildings and structures on the National Register of Historic Places in West Virginia
Historic districts in Wheeling, West Virginia
Italianate architecture in West Virginia
Industrial buildings completed in 1852
Historic American Engineering Record in West Virginia
National Register of Historic Places in Wheeling, West Virginia
Fastening tool manufacturers
Ironworks and steel mills in the United States
1852 establishments in Virginia
Historic districts on the National Register of Historic Places in West Virginia
Demolished buildings and structures in West Virginia
Buildings and structures demolished in 2017